Junction City is a village in Claiborne and Union parishes in Louisiana, United States, and is the twin city of neighboring Junction City, Arkansas. The population was 437 in 2020.

The Union Parish portion of Junction City is part of the Monroe Metropolitan Statistical Area.

Geography
According to the United States Census Bureau, the village has a total area of 1.2 square miles (3.2 km), all land.

Demographics

As of the 2020 United States census, there were 437 people, 251 households, and 158 families residing in the village.

References

External links

Villages in Louisiana
Villages in Claiborne Parish, Louisiana
Villages in Union Parish, Louisiana
Villages in Monroe, Louisiana metropolitan area